The Battle of Shanghai (1937) was the first of the twenty-two major engagements fought during the Second Sino-Japanese War.

Battle of Shanghai may also refer to:

 Battle of Shanghai (1861), a major engagement of the Taiping Rebellion
 Battle of Shanghai (1932), a short war between the armies of the Republic of China and the Empire of Japan
 Battle of Shanghai (1937)
 Battle of Shanghai (1949), a major engagement in the Chinese Civil War

See also
 Battle of Woosung (1842), a battle which allowed Britain to capture Shanghai in the First Opium War